Badminton was contested at the 2006 Asian Games in Doha, Qatar.  Singles, doubles, and team events were contested for both men and women. Mixed Doubles were also contested. Competition took place from November 30 to December 9. All events were held at Aspire Hall 3.

Schedule

Medalists

Medal table

Participating nations
A total of 162 athletes from 20 nations competed in badminton at the 2006 Asian Games:

References

Asian Games Complete Results

External links
Badminton Asia

 
2006
Asian Games
2006 Asian Games events
2006 Asian Games